Eurytides calliste is a species of butterfly in the family Papilionidae. It is found in the Neotropical realm.

Description
Bands and spots of the wings pale yellow or greenish yellow, similarly arranged as in Protographium dioxippus; submarginal row of the forewing curved; hindwing with 2, rarely 3 red spots, and with 2 very large greenish yellow marginal spots from the 2. radial to the 1. median; underside of the hindwing with pale marginal band.

Subspecies
E. c. calliste SE.Mexico (Puebla, Veracruz, Tabasco, Campeche, Yucatán, Quintana Roo, Oaxaca, Chiapas), Belize, Guatemala, El Salvador, Honduras.The two outer cell-bands of the forewing clearly developed and the last but two more or less indicated, the discal area eraarginate at the cell before the 2. median.
E. c. olbius (Rothschild & Jordan, 1906) Costa Rica - Panama (Chiriqui) Larger than the preceding (nominate) form; also the outer cell-bands of the forewing suffused with black in the middle; discal band broader, the black marginal area on both wings consequently narrower than in calliste; submarginal line of the forewing only vestigial from the 1. median backwards.

References

Further reading
Edwin Möhn, 2002 Schmetterlinge der Erde, Butterflies of the world Part XIIII (14), Papilionidae VIII: Baronia, Euryades, Protographium, Neographium, Eurytides. Edited by Erich Bauer and Thomas Frankenbach Keltern: Goecke & Evers; Canterbury: Hillside Books.  All species and subspecies are included, also most of the forms. Several females are shown the first time in colour.

External links

Eurytides
Butterflies described in 1864
Butterflies of Central America
Butterflies of North America
Taxa named by Henry Walter Bates